The year 1702 in science and technology involved some significant events.

Astronomy
 April 20 – Comet of 1702 (C/1702 H1): The 10th-closest comet approach in history, it missed Earth by a distance of 0.0437 AU (6,537,000 km).
 David Gregory publishes the first textbook, Astronomiae physicae et geometricae elementa, the first astronomy textbook based on Isaac Newton's principles of motions and theory of gravitation.

Technology
 A fountain pen was developed by Frenchman M. Bion. (Nicolas Bion (1652–1733) described a fountain pen in a treatise published in 1709; he did not claim to have invented them nor is there any evidence that he made them.)
 Pierre Varignon applies calculus to spring-driven clocks.

Births
 November 5 – Edward Stone, English polymath (died 1768)
 Undated
 Giuseppa Barbapiccola, Italian natural philosopher, poet and translator (died 1740)
 Benjamin Stillingfleet, English botanist (died 1771)

Deaths
 April – Clopton Havers, English physician who did pioneering research on the microstructure of bone  (born 1657)
 December 12 – Olof Rudbeck, Swedish physiologist who discovered that the thoracic duct is connected to the intestinal lymphatics (born 1630)

References

 
18th century in science
1700s in science